Meall Buidhe is a Corbett situated in the southern highlands of Scotland. It forms part of the ridge line separating Glen Daimh, an offshoot of Glen Lyon from Glen Lyon itself.

Corbetts
Marilyns of Scotland
Mountains and hills of the Southern Highlands
Mountains and hills of Argyll and Bute
Mountains and hills of Perth and Kinross